Irrara County is one of the 141 Cadastral divisions of New South Wales. It is located south of the border with Queensland, east of the Paroo River, and west of the Warrego River.

Irrara County has now towns of any size. The only settlements are the localities of Yantabulla, New South Wales and Fords Bridge, New South Wales. Yantabulla has been noted as being the future location of the rare double-sighting of solar eclipses within short intervals of one another.

Barringun, Queensland at the north eastern corner of the County, Hungerford, Queensland at the north west corner of the county Enngonia, New South Wales and Waanaring, New South Wales at the south west corner of the county all lie just outside the county.

Irrara is believed to be derived from a local Aboriginal word.

Parishes within this county
A full list of parishes found within this county; their current LGA and mapping coordinates to the approximate centre of each location is as follows:

References

 
Counties of New South Wales

External links
 1964 county map sheet 1, sheet 2. ("County of Irrara, Western Division, Land District of Bourke, Darling Shire / compiled, drawn & printed at the Department of Lands, Sydney, N.S.W" [1964]. National Library of Australia, MAP G8971.G46 svar)
 1932 county map sheet 1, sheet 2. ("County of Irrara, Western Division, Land District of Bourke, N.S.W., 1932 / compiled, drawn and printed at the Department of Lands, Sydney, N.S.W." National Library of Australia catalogue record.)
 1886 map of Irrara and other nearby counties.  ("Map of the counties of Poole, Tongowoko, Delalah, Thoucanna, Irrara, Evelyn, Yantara, Barrona, Farnell, Mootwingee, Yungnulgra, Fitzgerald, Killara, Werunda, Landsborough, Young, Rankin, Ularara", in The New atlas of Australia : the complete work containing over one hundred maps and full descriptive geography of New South Wales, Victoria, Queensland, South Australia and Western Australia, together with numerous illustrations and copious indices [edited by Robert McLean], John Sands publishers [1886]. National Library of Australia, MAP RaA 30 Plate 24 (NSW).)